The 2021 ACC men's soccer tournament will be the 35th edition of the ACC Men's Soccer Tournament. The tournament will decide the Atlantic Coast Conference champion and guaranteed representative into the 2021 NCAA Division I Men's Soccer Tournament. The final will be played at Sahlen's Stadium in Cary, North Carolina.

The Clemson Tigers were the defending champions, but were unable to defend their title, as they fell to Duke in the Semifinals.  Notre Dame won their first ACC title, by defeating NC State in the First Round, Louisville on penalties in the Quarterfinals, Pittsburgh in the Semifinals, and Duke in the Final, 2–0.  It was also the first ACC title for head coach Chad Riley.  Notre Dame was the 5 seed entering the tournament, and they became the lowest seeded team to win since Syracuse in 2015, who won as the 7th seed.

Qualification 

All twelve teams in the Atlantic Coast Conference earned a berth into the ACC Tournament. The winners of each division, Atlantic and Coastal, will be seeds 1 and 2. The top 4 seeds received first round byes and hosted the winner of a first round game. The remaining 10 teams in the conference will be seeded according to points awarded in conference matches.  All rounds, with the exception of the final will be held at the higher seed's home field.  Seeding is determined by regular season conference record.

(*: division winners are automatically given the top two seeds).

Bracket 
*Note: Home team listed first.  Rankings shown are ACC Tournament Seeds.

Matches

First round

Quarterfinals

Semifinals

Final

Statistics

Goalscorers

All-Tournament team 

MVP in Bold

References 

2021
 
November 2021 sports events in the United States
2021 in sports in North Carolina